This is a list of tennis players who have represented the Austria Davis Cup team in an official Davis Cup match. Austria have taken part in the competition since 1905.

Players

Last updated after the 2020 Davis Cup Qualifying Round.

References

Aus
Tennis in Austria